Captain Alfredo Abón Lee (October 25, 1927 – December 4, 2012) was a Cuban army officer of Chinese Cuban ancestry who was the commander of the garrison at Yaguajay Squadron and was sent to Las Villa, replacing Colonel Roger Rojas Lavernia, where he fought the 26th of July Movement in December 1958 in one of the final engagements of the Cuban Revolution. Before that, he served in the Battalion 22 during operations in Eastern Cuba.

He died on December 4, 2012 in Englewood, New Jersey, United States.

References

Cuban military personnel
People of the Cuban Revolution
Cuban people of Chinese descent
1927 births
2012 deaths
Cuban emigrants to the United States
People from Englewood, New Jersey
20th-century Cuban military personnel
https://chinesefamilyhistory.org/roots-cuba/